Stereocaulon groenlandicum is a species of snow lichen belonging to the family Stereocaulaceae.

Ecology
Stereocaulon groenlandicum is a known host to the lichenicolous fungus species:

 Arthonia stereocaulina
 Catillaria stereocaulorum
 Cercidospora stereocaulorum
 Diploschistes muscorum
 Lasiosphaeriopsis stereocaulicola
 Lichenopeltella stereocaulorum
 Lichenosticta dombrovskae
 Opegrapha stereocaulicola
 Polycoccum trypethelioides
 Rhymbocarpus stereocaulorum
 Sphaerellothecium stereocaulorum
 Taeniolella christiansenii

References

Stereocaulaceae
Lichen species
Taxa named by Eilif Dahl
Lichens described in 1950